West Nooksack Glacier is in North Cascades National Park in the U.S. state of Washington, on the eastern slopes of Mount Shuksan, immediately northeast of the subpeak called Nooksack Tower. West Nooksack Glacier is only  in length and is a glacial remnant. West Nooksack Glacier provides meltwater for the Nooksack River.

See also
List of glaciers in the United States

References

Glaciers of the North Cascades
Glaciers of Whatcom County, Washington
Glaciers of Washington (state)